Isaak Phillips (born September 28, 2001) is a Canadian professional ice hockey defenceman for the  Chicago Blackhawks of the National Hockey League (NHL).

Personal life 
Phillips was born in Barrie. His paternal grandparents were from St. Vincent, and his mother is Finnish.

Playing career
Phillips played junior for the Sudbury Wolves in the Ontario Hockey League (OHL) and was selected by the Blackhawks in the fifth -round, 141st overall, of the 2020 NHL Entry Draft. He signed a three-year entry-level contract with the Blackhawks in March 2021 and played his first NHL game on October 29, 2021.

International play 
Phillips represented Jamaica at the 2018 Team Elite Hockey Prospect Showcase, winning the tournament. Though he is not of Jamaican descent, the team included players of all West Indian backgrounds.

Career statistics

References

External links

2001 births
Living people
Chicago Blackhawks draft picks
Chicago Blackhawks players
Rockford IceHogs (AHL) players
Sudbury Wolves players